The 1858 Delaware gubernatorial election was held on November 2, 1858. Incumbent Know Nothing Governor Peter F. Causey was unable to seek re-election. His 1854 opponent, William Burton, once again ran as the Democratic nominee. James S. Buckmaster, the former State Treasurer, ran as the People's Party candidate. Burton narrowly defeated Buckmaster to win back the governorship for the Democratic Party.

General election

Results

References

Bibliography
 
 
 
 Delaware House Journal, 67th General Assembly, 1st Reg. Sess. (1859).

Notes

1858
Delaware
Gubernatorial